Donald Alasdair Calum Maclennan (9 December 1929 – 9 February 2009) was a South African poet, critic, playwright and English professor.

He published a number of plays, short stories, collections of poems and scholarly works.

Born on 9 December 1929, in London, England, Maclennan came to South Africa as a child in 1938. He was educated at Witwatersrand University and Edinburgh University.

Maclennan's academic career included lecturing at Wits University and the University of Cape Town. He taught in both South Africa and the United States. He began teaching at Rhodes University in 1966, teaching English there for more than 40 years, although he officially retired in 1994. In later years, he continued to teach at the university, giving weekly seminars for another decade.

In his final years, he self-published a number of works of poetry. In his last decade, Maclennan had motor-neuron disease. He suffered a stroke in January 2009, although his mind was not affected by it. He died on 9 February 2009, in Port Elizabeth.

Bibliography
Years link to corresponding "[year] in poetry" article for poetry; for literature, to corresponding "[year] in literature" article:

Poetry
 1971: In Memoriam Oskar Wolberheim, A.A. Balkema, combining Maclennan's poetry and the music of Norbert Nowotny
 1977: Life Songs, Bateleur Press
 Bateleur Poets, 
 1983: Reckonings, New Africa Books,  
 1988: Collecting Darkness, Justified Press, 
 1992: Letters: New Poems, Carrefour Press, 
 1995: The Poetry Lesson: New Poems Snailpress, 
 1997: Solstice: Poems, winner of South Africa's Sanlam Literary Award for 1997
 1998: Of Women and Some Men with George Coutouvidis, Firfield Poetry Press,   
 2001: 
 Notes from a Rhenish Mission, Firfield Press,  
 A Brief History of Madness in the Eastern Cape, with drawings by Siddis Firfield, Firfield Press, 
 2002: Rock paintings at Salem, self-published, Rhodes University GSU
 2002: The Road to Kromdraai, Publisher Snailpress, 
 2003: The Dinner Party, self-published, Rhodes University GSU
 2003: A Letter to William Blake, self-published, Rhodes University GSU
 2003: Under Compassberg, self-published, Rhodes University GSU
 2004: Excavations, self-published, Rhodes University GSU
 2005: Reading the Signs, Carapace
 2006: The necessary salt, self-published, Rhodes University GSU
 2006: Selected Poems, Quartz Press
 2007: The owl of Minerva, self-published, Rhodes University GSU
 2008: Through a Glass Darkly, self-published, Rhodes University GSU
 2010: Dress Rehearsal, self-published, Rhodes University GSU
 2012: Collected Poems, Print Matters Heritage Press (ed. Dan Wylie) ISBN 978-0-987009562

Other works
 An Enquiry into the Voyage of the Santiago, a play
 Job Mava, a play, written and performed in 1972/3 by The Ikhwezi Players, published 1981/2
 My Childhood, adaptation of Maxim Gorky's play, performed in 1975 by The Ikhwezi Players
 2004: Editor, with Malcolm Hacksley, A Ruthless Fidelity: Collected Poems of Douglas Livingstone, publisher: Ad Donker,  
 Olive Schreiner and After: Essays on Southern African Literature in Honour of Guy Butler Publisher: D. Philip, 
 Sarah Christie, Don Maclennan, Geoffrey Hutchings, Perspectives on South African Fiction, Publisher Ad. Donker,

Notes

1929 births
2009 deaths
21st-century South African poets
Academic staff of Rhodes University
20th-century South African poets
South African male poets
20th-century South African male writers
21st-century South African male writers